Melvin Price Locks and Dam is a dam and two locks at river mile 200.78 on the Upper Mississippi River, about  north of Saint Louis, Missouri. The collocated , explains the structure and its engineering.

Background
Construction began in 1979, the main lock opened in 1990, and the full structure was completed in 1994. It replaced the earlier Lock and Dam No. 26, demolished in 1990, and is the first replacement structure on the Upper Mississippi River nine-foot navigation project. The main lock has a vertical lift gate and a miter gate while the aux. lock has two miter gates.

It is named after Illinois Congressman Charles Melvin Price.

Gallery

References

External links
Melvin Price Locks and Dam - U.S. Army Corps of Engineers
National Great Rivers Museum (USACE)
U.S. Army Corps of Engineers, Rivers Project Office

Hydroacoustic Identification and Sampling of Fish Aggregations in Tailwater Areas (2005 Monitoring Report – Fish Passage Melvin Price Locks and Dam, Alton, Illinois and Lock and Dam 22, Saverton, Missouri)
Map of Melvin Price Locks and Dam area

Dams in Illinois
Buildings and structures in Madison County, Illinois
Mississippi River locks
Buildings and structures in St. Charles County, Missouri
Dams in Missouri
United States Army Corps of Engineers dams
Transport infrastructure completed in 1990
Historic American Engineering Record in Illinois
Historic American Engineering Record in Missouri
Gravity dams
Dams on the Mississippi River
Mississippi Valley Division
Transportation buildings and structures in Madison County, Illinois
Locks of Illinois
Locks of Missouri